Gravel is a type of rock.

Gravel or Gravell may also refer to:

 Gravel (surname)
 Gravel pit, a mine for gravel
 Gravel bar, an accumulation of gravel-size sediment in a river
 River gravel, a subtype of gravel stone
 Aquarium gravel, the common name for an aquarium's substrate
 Gravel road, a type of road
 Gravel disease, the archaic name of kidney stones
 Gravel mines, a type of weapon

Places
 Gravel Ridge, Arkansas, town 
 Gravel Springs, Virginia, community
 Queenstown Oval, Tasmania, also known as the Gravel, a gravel-surfaced football field in Queenstown, Tasmania

Music and entertainment
 "Gravel Pit", a song by Wu-Tang Clan
 The Gravel Pit, band from Boston
 Gravel (Lithuanian band), band from Lithuania
 Gravel, personal and set-top media players by Commodore International Corporation
 Gravel (comics), an ongoing comic series written by Warren Ellis
 Gravel (video game), a 2018 racing video game

Other
 A recreational drug sold as "gravel" or "flakka" (alpha-Pyrrolidinopentiophenone)